Barringtonia longisepala grows as a tree up to  tall, with a trunk diameter of up to . Bark is dark grey or greyish brown. Flowers are yellow. Habitat is hillside and swamp forests. B. longisepala is endemic to Borneo.

References

longisepala
Endemic flora of Borneo
Trees of Borneo
Plants described in 1967